
Dizelaši (singular dizelaš) was an urban street youth sub-culture popular in the 1990s in Serbia. It has been described as a mainstream fashion and social subculture, that of a working class, similar to the British chav, French  and Russian gopnik. The French movie La Haine (1995) is often mentioned in relation to these subcultures. It was characterized by turbo-folk, hip-hop and dance music (such as Đogani), mass-appeal designer clothes (such as Diesel), embroidered sweatshirts and sportswear (such as Nike Air Max and Reebok Pump shoes and Kappa sweatsuits) and large link chains. Track jackets were tucked into the bottom pants which in turn were tucked into socks, as to conceal goods; it is said that legendary gangster Knele (1971–1992) popularised it, having used it as a tactic ensuring his gun would slide into his socks rather on the pavement when running from the police.

It emerged in Belgrade in the late 1980s and became popular by 1992, in a period of embargo on FR Yugoslavia following the outbreak of the Yugoslav Wars. The youths were stereotyped as gangsters (also called mangupi), involved in illegal activities such as fuel smuggling. The Russian counterpart is the Gopnik sub-culture, with which it is grouped together into "Post-Soviet fashion" that has become popular in recent years. In contrast to the dizelaši, the opposing sub-culture was called padavičari, including hippies, rockers, headbangers, metalheads and ravers.  A typical dizelaš was seen as:

The resurge of the fashion has been dubbed Neodizelaši. The 1995 documentary about Belgrade gangsters, Crime that Changed Serbia, is an icon of the culture.

In movies

 Dva sata kvalitetnog TV programa, 1994 film
 Crime that Changed Serbia, 1995 documentary about Belgrade criminals
 The Wounds, 1998 film about a violent teen duo in Belgrade
 Skinning, 2010 film
 Welcome to Dizeldorf, meaning Welcome to Diesel village, Mashan Lekitch - Mašan Lekić 1994 documentary about Belgrade nineties culture

See also
Chav, sub-culture in UK
Gopnik, sub-culture in Russia
Šatrovački, sociolect

References

Sources

Papović J., Pejović A. (2016) Revival without Nostalgia: The ‘Dizel’ Movement, Serbian 1990s Cultural Trauma and Globalised Youth Cultures. In: Schwartz M., Winkel H. (eds) Eastern European Youth Cultures in a Global Context. Palgrave Macmillan, London

External links

1990s in Belgrade
Social class subcultures
Serbian youth culture
Serbian culture
Criminal subcultures
Working class in Europe
Socioeconomic stereotypes